"Off Guard" is a song by Albanian singer Elvana Gjata featuring American singer Ty Dolla Sign. Sony under exclusive license from East Music Matters (EMM) released it as a single for digital download and streaming on 6 April 2018.

Background and composition 

Elvana Gjata wrote the song alongside Ty Dolla Sign, Dominic Jordan, Jimmy Giannos and Poo Bear. The production was handled by the latter and The Audibles. Josh Gudwin and Chris G were additionally hired for the song's mixing and mastering process. The song was released as a single through Sony Music under exclusive license from East Music Matters. It is a dance-pop recording incorporating electronic and R&B influences into its sound. The song is entirely performed in the English language, constituting Gjata's second single in the respective language.

Music video and reception 

The accompanying music video for the "Off Guard" was announced to be released on 1 April 2018 by a teaser uploaded on Gjata's Facebook profile though it was premiered onto Gjata's YouTube channel simultaneously with the song's release on 6 April 2018. It was directed by the American film director Ethan Lader in Venice Beach at Los Angeles, California.

Personnel 

Credits adapted from Tidal and YouTube.

Elvana Gjatacomposing, songwriting, vocals
Chris Gmastering, mixing
Dominic Jordancomposing, songwriting
Jimmy Giannoscomposing, songwriting
Josh Gudwinmastering, mixing
Poo Bearcomposing, producing, songwriting
The Audiblesproducing
Ty Dolla Signcomposing, songwriting

Track listing 

Digital download
"Off Guard"3:09

Charts

Release history

References 

2018 singles
2018 songs
Elvana Gjata songs
Sony Music singles
Song recordings produced by the Audibles
Songs written by Dominic Jordan
Songs written by James Giannos
Songs written by Poo Bear
Songs written by Ty Dolla Sign